Daviesia tortuosa is a species of flowering plant in the family Fabaceae and is endemic to the south-west of Western Australia. It is a spreading, glabrous shrub with tangled, zigzagging branchlets, sharply-pointed, narrowly elliptic phyllodes, and yellow flowers with faint orange markings.

Description

Taxonomy
Daviesia tortuosa was first formally described in 1995 by Michael Crisp in Australian Systematic Botany from specimens he collected near Lake Grace in 1978. The specific epithet (tortuosa) means "zig-zag", referring to the branching of this species.

Distribution and habitat
This daviesia grows in kwongan heath roughly between Kulin, Dumbleyung and Lake Grace in the Avon Wheatbelt and Mallee biogeographic regions of south-western Western Australia.

Conservation status
Daviesia speciosa is classified as "Priority Three" by the Government of Western Australia Department of Biodiversity, Conservation and Attractions, meaning that it is poorly known and known from only a few locations but is not under imminent threat.

References

tortuosa
Taxa named by Michael Crisp
Plants described in 1995
Flora of Western Australia